Wath Central railway station was on the South Yorkshire Railway's Doncaster–Barnsley Exchange line in England. It was the closest of Wath-upon-Dearne's three railway stations to the town centre, lying immediately to its north-east, over the Dearne and Dove Canal bridge. The station was closed when local passenger services on the line ended on 29 June 1959. (The line continued to be used for freight traffic until 1988).

The buildings were in the Manchester, Sheffield and Lincolnshire Railway's large "Double Pavilion" style, an indication that rebuilding had taken place in the last quarter of the 19th century. The main building, with four bays, was on the Doncaster-bound platform. The station buildings were not demolished until the area was cleared during road improvement works in 2004.

References

External links 
 Wath stations on navigable 1955 O. S. map

Disused railway stations in Rotherham
Railway stations in Great Britain opened in 1851
Railway stations in Great Britain closed in 1959
Wath upon Dearne
Former South Yorkshire Railway stations
1851 establishments in England